Caspar Milquetoast was a popular American cartoon character created by H. T. Webster. The term “milquetoast” has since come to be used for a meek or timid person.

Milquetoast may also refer to:

Dr. Milquetoast, a character in "The Pacifist", by Arthur C. Clarke
"Milquetoast" (song), a 1994 song from Helmet's album Betty
Milquetoast the Cockroach, one of the minor characters in Bloom County
Milquetoast, a class available in the video game Bloodborne

See also
Milk toast, a dish consisting of buttered toast in milk